Gracie Lake is a  lake located on Vancouver Island north west of the north end of Nahmint Lake.

References

Alberni Valley
Lakes of Vancouver Island
Clayoquot Land District